was a women's football team which played in Division 1 of Japan's Nadeshiko League. It founded the league in 1989. The club was disbanded in 1999.

Honors

Domestic competitions
Nadeshiko.League Division 1
Champions (1) : 1989
Runners-up (4) : 1990, 1991, 1992, 1993
Empress's Cup All-Japan Women's Football Tournament
Champions (1) : 1991
Runners-up (2) : 1989, 1990

Results

Transition of team name
Shimizu FC Women : 1986 - 1988
Shimizu FC Ladies : 1989
Suzuyo Shimizu FC Lovely Ladies : 1990 - 1999

Former players

  Anneli Andelén
  Kristin Bengtsson
  Cindy Daws
  Nathalie Geeris
  Futaba Kioka
  Keri Sanchez
  Chou Tai-ying

External links 

Japanese women's club teams

Women's football clubs in Japan
1976 establishments in Japan
Sports teams in Shizuoka Prefecture
Association football clubs established in 1976